Season 2004-05 saw Livingston compete in the Scottish Premier League. They also competed in the League Cup and the Scottish Cup.

Summary
Livingston finished third bottom of the SPL in 10th place and reached the Quarter Finals of both the Scottish Cup and Co-operative Insurance Cup.

Managers
Livingston started the season under Allan Preston who was sacked by the club on 5 November 2004 with Richard Gough being appointed as his replacement on 30 November.

Results & fixtures

SPL

League Cup

Scottish Cup

Statistics

League table

References

Livingston
Livingston F.C. seasons